Giulio Bizzotto (born 15 October 1996) is an Italian footballer who plays as a forward for Serie D club Cartigliano.

Career
Bizzotto began his career with A.S. Cittadella. He was first included in a matchday squad on 25 April 2015, remaining an unused substitute in a goalless draw away to Brescia in Serie B. His debut came on 9 May at the Stadio Pier Cesare Tombolato, replacing Daniele Bazzoffia in the 71st minute and nine minutes later netting an equaliser for a 1–1 draw with Frosinone. In a season which ended in relegation to Lega Pro, he made only one more appearance, in a 0–2 home defeat to Perugia 13 days later.

On 2 August 2015, in the first round of the Coppa Italia, Bizzotto netted four goals in a 15–0 home win over Potenza, two goals in either half. A week later in the second round, he opened a 2–0 win at Teramo. He eventually finished the 2015–16 season as the top-scorer of the Coppa Italia, with five goals.

On 8 January 2019, he moved to Cartigliano in the Serie D.

Honours

Individual
 Coppa Italia top goalscorer: 2015–16

References

External links
 
 

1996 births
People from Thiene
Sportspeople from the Province of Vicenza
Living people
Italian footballers
Association football forwards
A.S. Cittadella players
FeralpiSalò players
A.C. Renate players
U.S. Viterbese 1908 players
Serie B players
Serie C players
Footballers from Veneto